The 2010 Intersport Heilbronn Open (known as the 2010 Intersport Heilbronn Open presented by Wilson for sponsorship reasons) was a professional tennis tournament played on indoor hard courts. It was part of the 2010 ATP Challenger Tour. It took place in Talheim, Germany between 25 and 31 January 2010.

ATP entrants

Seeds

 Rankings are as of January 18, 2010.

Other entrants
The following players received wildcards into the singles main draw:
  Nils Langer
  Louk Sorensen
  Cedrik-Marcel Stebe

The following players received entry from the qualifying draw:
  Tobias Kamke
  Jan Mertl
  Michał Przysiężny
  Yuri Schukin

The following player received the lucky loser spot:
  Robin Vik

Champions

Singles

 Michael Berrer def.  Andrey Golubev, 6–3, 7–6(7–4).

Doubles

 Sanchai Ratiwatana /  Sonchat Ratiwatana def.  Mario Ančić /  Lovro Zovko, 6–4, 7–5.

External links

Intersport Heilbronn Open
2010 in German tennis
Intersport Heilbronn Open
2010s in Baden-Württemberg